The Muara Naval Base, is a naval base that serves as the main headquarters for the Royal Brunei Navy (RBN), which is located in Muara, Brunei-Muara District, Brunei. It can also be noted that the base sits near the mouth of the Brunei River, which flows into the Brunei Bay.

History 
During World War II, then occupied Muara was previously used by the Japanese Navy as a naval base until the country was liberated by the Australian 9th Division. The Royal Brunei Navy's administration of First Sea Battalion was relocated to its current location in 1974. The United States Navy warship USS Robert E. Peary (FF-1073) was berthed at the naval base in 1989. Brunei ordered three Nakhoda Ragam-class corvettes and were planned to be based at the naval base in 1991. Despite that, all three ships of the class were never commissioned into the navy.

In 1997, the base's upgrade project costed B$140 million, in which it included the construction of a new 314m long quay, shiplift and renovation of its existing facilities. The project was carried out in order to facilitate the three new Darussalam-class offshore patrol vessels. Between 2007 and 2012, ammunition and explosive storage bunkers were constructed not far from the base, at Kampong Kapok.

Another B$44.6 million project was carried out in July 2011, to provide new accommodation facilities for the base's personnel. During BRIDEX 2011, the navy celebrated its 46th Anniversary at the naval base. In which 24 warships from 10 countries were invited. On February 23, 2014, a ro-ro car carrier Trans Future 2 collided with KDB Berkat (18) and another Ijtihad-class patrol boat while in port. Later in May, Sultan Hassanal Bolkiah landed his Sikorsky S-70 at the naval base in which he visited the KDB Afiat (20) and witness a naval exercise. Later that year on November 11, the 20th annual Cooperation Afloat Readiness and Training (CARAT) between the United States and Brunei began at the naval base.

May 29, 2013, President Tony Tan made visit to the Muara Naval Base. On November 12, 2018, the 24th annual CARAT began at the naval base in which it involved several exercises in the South China Sea with USNS Fall River (T-EPF-4) and a P-8A Poseidon maritime patrol aircraft. The 25th annual CARAT was once again held at the naval base on October 31, 2019.

Units 
Three naval divisions are based in the naval base:

 Operation Division
 Administrative Division
 Support Division

References

External links
Royal Brunei Navy official website

1974 establishments in Brunei
Brunei-Muara District
Royal Brunei Navy